Maintenance Phase is a health science and pop culture podcast that aims to debunk health and wellness-industry myths and discusses anti-fatness in mainstream American culture. It is hosted by Aubrey Gordon and Michael Hobbes. Launched in 2020, the podcast has addressed topics such as The Keto diet, Presidential Fitness Test, Weight Watchers, and various fad diets.

About
Aubrey Gordon is an American author and activist who writes about fat liberation. Michael Hobbes is an American journalist and former reporter for the HuffPost. Both of them have written numerous times about the misinformation that originates from the health and wellness industry, as well as anti-fatness in American popular culture.

In each episode, one of the hosts talks to the other about a particular topic and they both discuss and give insight on the subject. The majority of their episodes focus on a particular health product or widely-accepted fact that Gordon and Hobbes then discuss.

Many of their episodes focus on debunking scientific misinformation in an easily understandable manner.

The podcast is independently funded, relying on crowd-funding.

Reception

In 2022, Outside regarded it as "the best podcast we've heard about health". Emma Dibdin of the New York Times wrote, "This is essential listening for anyone who's ever been in the grips of the diet industrial complex, and wants to get deprogrammed."

The same year it also won a Webby Award for best podcast series.

Episodes

2020

2021

2022

References 

American podcasts
Health and wellness podcasts
Patreon creators
2020 podcast debuts
Feminist podcasts
History podcasts